Lasiosphaeria ovina is a species of fungi belonging to the family Lasiosphaeriaceae.

References

Lasiosphaeriaceae